Kishorenagar is a Town in Angul district Odisha state in India.it is Also called as Rajkishorenagar.It is a Block under Athmallik Sub-Division.it is a Tahasil Area and Block Headquarter Office in there. It was 85 km from District Headquarter Angul. 

Odisha
Angul district